Brian Anthony Robiskie (born December 3, 1987) is a former American football wide receiver. He was drafted by the Cleveland Browns in the second round of the 2009 NFL Draft. He played college football at Ohio State.

Robiskie has also played for the Jacksonville Jaguars, Detroit Lions, and Tennessee Titans.

Early years
Robiskie was born in Los Angeles, California, and grew up in the Cleveland, Ohio area, where his father was a Cleveland Browns assistant coach. He attended Chagrin Falls High School, where he set numerous school records as a wide receiver.

College career
Robiskie played college football at Ohio State. He saw little playing time in his freshman and sophomore season at Ohio State, but caught the winning touchdown pass in Ohio State's annual rivalry game with Michigan in 2006, and was named a starter his junior season. His performance in the 2007 season helped the Buckeyes advance to the 2008 BCS National Championship Game. Robiskie's receptions and yards were down in the 2008 season with new freshman quarterback Terrelle Pryor at the helm, but he was still a highly touted prospect coming into the 2009 NFL Draft.

Professional career
The Cleveland Browns selected Robiskie in the second round of the 2009 NFL Draft, the 36th overall pick. On November 1, 2011, Robiskie was waived by the Browns in order to clear a roster slot to sign running back Thomas Clayton.

Robiskie was claimed off waivers by the Jacksonville Jaguars on November 2, 2011, and was released on September 10, 2012.

Robiskie was signed by the Detroit Lions on October 24, 2012, and appeared in 6 games for them. He was released by the Lions on April 8, 2013, re-signed on April 15, and cut again by the Lions on June 24.

Robiskie was signed by the Atlanta Falcons on October 10, 2013, following a season-ending injury to Julio Jones. He was released by the team on November 26.

Robiskie signed with the Tennessee Titans on May 2, 2014.  He was subsequently released by the Tennessee Titans on August 29, 2014.

Career statistics
Robiskie's career NFL statistics, through 2013, are:

Personal life
Robiskie is the son of Terry Robiskie, and the brother of Kyle and Andrew Robiskie.

References

External links
Brian Robiskie at ESPN.com
Ohio State Buckeyes bio
Rivals.com bio

1987 births
Living people
Players of American football from Ohio
American football wide receivers
Ohio State Buckeyes football players
Cleveland Browns players
Jacksonville Jaguars players
Detroit Lions players
Atlanta Falcons players
Tennessee Titans players